Orton Randolph Karickhoff (November 6, 1905 – August 21, 1987) was an American politician who served in both houses of the West Virginia Legislature. He won election to the House against Democrat Richard L. Miller in 1972, 22 years after his service in the state senate, but lost a rematch in the newly-drawn 9th district two years later.

References

1905 births
1987 deaths
Republican Party members of the West Virginia House of Delegates
Republican Party West Virginia state senators